Josef Märkl (16 January 1928 – 14 October 2010) was a German violinist, composer and music educator. He was a member of the radio orchestras in Munich, Stuttgart and Baden-Baden. Most recently he was concertmaster of the Deutsche Oper am Rhein and primarius of the Märkl Quartet.

Life 
Märkl was born in Vilshofen an der Donau. He studied privately with Hedi Gigler, Roman Schimmer and Heinz Stanske as well as with Wilhelm Stross at the Hochschule für Musik und Theater München.

At the age of 17, 1945/46, he became a member (1st violin) of the Symphonieorchester des Bayerischen Rundfunks in Munich. From 1946 to 1950 he played with the Radio-Sinfonieorchester Stuttgart des SWR (renamed in 1949 to Sinfonieorchester von Radio Stuttgart bzw. des Süddeutschen Rundfunks) under Hans Müller-Kray. From 1950 to 1956 he worked with the SWR Sinfonieorchester Baden-Baden und Freiburg in Baden-Baden, conducted by Hans Rosbaud. From 1962 to 1968 he was engaged as study director and concertmaster with the Düsseldorf Symphony Orchestra, whose principal conductors were Jean Martinon and Rafael Frühbeck de Burgos.

From 1964 he played chamber music as successor of Oscar C. Yatco the 2nd violin in the famous Stross Quartet. Besides his teacher, his colleagues included Gérard Ruymen (viola) and Rudolf Metzmacher. (cello). Together with Metzmacher, he founded the Märkl Quartet in Cologne in 1968, with which he continued the tradition of the Stross Quartet in the function of Primarius. His younger son Key-Thomas Märkl was also a member of the string quartet at times. Furthermore, Märkl was founder and artistic director of the Wilhelm-Kempff-Ensemble. Märkl was involved in several radio and record productions.

He was a member of the European String Teachers Association. Schott Music published his multi-volume compendia for violin and viola.

He had three children with a Japanese pianist. His older son Jun Märkl (born in 1959) became a conductor, Key-Thomas Märkl (born in 1963) a violinist. The latter is associated with the writer and composer Kim Märkl. Märkl was married to Brigitte Märkl (1931-2011), née Jaenisch, until his death in 2010.

Märkl died in Seehausen am Staffelsee at the age of 82.

Work 
Textbooks
 Violintechnik intensiv (3 volumes, Schott, 1999/2000)
 Volume 1: Konditionstraining
 Volume 2: Bogentechnik.
 Volume 3: Einspielübungen "Fit in 20 Minuten"
 Violatechnik intensiv (2 volumes, Schott, 2004/05)
 Volume 1: Konditionstraining und Bogentechnik
 Volume 2: Einspielübungen 30 "Wake up"-Programme.

Compositions
 Carneval der Finger. 3 Etudes for the 2nd and 3rd finger (Schott, 2001)
 Paraphrasen über Paganinis Barucaba-Variationen for viola solo (Varner, 2006)

Discography 
 Ludwig van Beethoven: Streichquartette op. 135 and 18/2 with the Stross Quartet (Aarton Music, 1983)
 Juan Crisóstomo de Arriaga: String quartets no. 1 and 2 E flat major (Aarton Music, 1983)
 Werner Egk: La Tentation de Saint Antoine and Juan Crisóstomo de Arriaga: String quartet no. 3 E flat major with Marijke Hendriks (mezzo-soprano) (Aarton Music, 1983)

Further reading 
 Adrian Gaster (ed.): International Who’s who in Music and Musicians’ Directory. 8th edition, Melrose Press, Cambridge 1977, .
 Ernest Kay (ed.): Men of Achievement. 6th edition, Melrose Press, Cambridge 1979, .

References

External links 
 
 Josef Märkl bei Schott Music
 

1928 births
2010 deaths
People from Vilshofen an der Donau
Concertmasters
German classical violinists
Male classical violinists
20th-century classical composers
German music educators
20th-century German male musicians